Ebenezer Joseph Tettley "Ben" Kudjodji (born 23 April 1989) is an English footballer who plays as a striker.

Career
Kudjodji was a graduate of the Crystal Palace academy. He made one appearance for the Eagles in their 2–0 victory over Barnsley in the Championship on 15 March 2008, replacing Clinton Morrison as a substitute in the 89th minute. Crystal Palace manager Neil Warnock described Kudjodji as "a smashing lad and deserved his opportunity in the team, but he couldn't sustain the level that saw earn his debut." He was released from Crystal Palace in May 2008, along with Mark Kennedy and Moses Swaibu.

Kudjodji went on to play for Bromley in the Conference South, making his only appearance in the 2–0 loss against Braintree Town before being substituted in the 46th minute for Nic McDonnell. He then left to join Croydon Athletic, again only playing one match in their 3–2 defeat at home to Sittingbourne, before walking out on the club. In 2008, Kudjodji had unsuccessful trials with Brentford and Cheltenham Town.

Conviction
He was sentenced to six years imprisonment for drug dealing in January 2019.

References

External links
Ben Kudjodji player profile at cpfc.co.uk

1989 births
Living people
People from Dunstable
Footballers from Bedfordshire
English footballers
Association football forwards
Crystal Palace F.C. players
Bromley F.C. players
Croydon Athletic F.C. players
Sutton United F.C. players
Carshalton Athletic F.C. players
English Football League players
National League (English football) players